Daniël Theodoor Mensch (born 4 October 1978 in Sliedrecht) is a Dutch athlete who won the silver medal in the 2004 Summer Olympics for rowing as a member of the 8-man Dutch rowing team.
Additionally, he was a member of the Maastricht rowing fraternity MSRV Saurus.

References

1978 births
Living people
Dutch male rowers
Rowers at the 2004 Summer Olympics
Olympic rowers of the Netherlands
Olympic silver medalists for the Netherlands
People from Sliedrecht
Olympic medalists in rowing
Medalists at the 2004 Summer Olympics
Sportspeople from South Holland